Manuel Bryennios or Bryennius (c. 1275 – c. 1340) was a Byzantine scholar who flourished in Constantinople about 1300 teaching astronomy, mathematics and musical theory. His only surviving work is the Harmonika (Greek: Ἁρμονικά), which is a three-volume codification of Byzantine musical scholarship based on the classical Greek works of Ptolemy, Nicomachus, and the Neopythagorean authors on the numerological theory of music. One of Bryennios's students was Theodore Metochites, the grand logothete during the reign of Emperor Andronikos II Palaiologos (r. 1272–1328). Metochites studied astronomy under Bryennios.

References

Citations

Sources

Byzantine astronomers
Music theorists
Byzantine music
Manuel
1275 births
1340 deaths
13th-century Byzantine people
14th-century Byzantine people
13th-century scholars
14th-century scholars
13th-century Byzantine scientists
14th-century Byzantine scientists
13th-century Greek people
14th-century Greek people
13th-century Greek scientists
14th-century Greek scientists
13th-century Greek educators
14th-century Greek educators
13th-century Greek mathematicians
14th-century Greek mathematicians
13th-century Greek astronomers
14th-century Greek astronomers
13th-century Greek musicians
14th-century Greek musicians